Red bean cake is a type of Chinese cake with a sweet red bean paste filling. There are many regional varieties.

Cantonese-style
Cantonese-style red bean cake is made with hardened red bean paste that has been frozen. The cake is sweetened and sprinkled with sesame seed.  It is generally tough to bite, and is served as a square block.  Depending on the particular region within China, this may be seen as a year-round snack, or as a seasonal pastry consumed on certain traditional Chinese holidays.

See also
 Red bean soup
 Mooncake
 List of Chinese desserts
 List of desserts
 List of legume dishes
 Yōkan – similar Japanese food made with red beans

References

Cantonese cuisine
Cakes
Chinese desserts
Legume dishes